is a Japanese footballer who plays as a forward for WE League club INAC Kobe Leonessa and the Japan national team.

Club career
Tanaka was born in Thailand on April 28, 1994. On May 3, 2011, she made her debut for Nippon TV Beleza in a 1–0 loss to Okayama Yunogo Belle. On August 14, she scored her first goal in a 5–0 home victory against Fukuoka J. Anclas. She became top scorer in 2016 and 2017. She was also selected Best Eleven for 3 years in a row (2015–2017).

In 2020, Tanaka signed for INAC Kobe Leonessa. After the season was delayed by two months due to the COVID-19 pandemic, Tanaka made her club debut in the season opener on July 18. She scored the only goal of the match.

National team career
Tanaka was part of the Japan U-17 national team that finished in second place at the 2010 U-17 World Cup and of the U-20 team that finished in third place at the 2012 U-20 World Cup. In February 2013, she received her first senior team call-up. On March 8, she made her debut for Japan and scored her first goal in a 2–1 loss to Germany in the 2013 Algarve Cup. In 2018, she played at 2018 Asian Cup and Japan won the championship. She played 35 games and scored 14 goals for Japan.

Career statistics
.

International

National team goals
Scores and results list Japan goal tally first.

Honours
Nippon TV Beleza
Nadeshiko League: 2015, 2016, 2017, 2018, 2019
Empress's Cup: 2014, 2017, 2018
Nadeshiko League Cup: 2012, 2016, 2018
INAC Kobe Leonessa

 WE League: 2021-22

Individual
Nadeshiko League Top Scorer: 2016, 2017, 2018, 2019
Nadeshiko League Best XI: 2015, 2016, 2017, 2018, 2019
Nadeshiko League Best Player Award (MVP): 2018, 2019

References

External links

Mina Tanaka at Japan Football Association
Mina Tanaka at NTV Beleza

1994 births
Living people
Japanese women's footballers
Japan women's international footballers
Nadeshiko League players
Nippon TV Tokyo Verdy Beleza players
Women's association football forwards
Footballers at the 2018 Asian Games
Asian Games gold medalists for Japan
Asian Games medalists in football
Medalists at the 2018 Asian Games
Footballers at the 2020 Summer Olympics
Olympic footballers of Japan
Bayer 04 Leverkusen (women) players
Expatriate women's footballers in Germany
Japanese expatriate sportspeople in Germany
Frauen-Bundesliga players
Nadeshiko League MVPs